David Trail (1875-1935) was a rugby union international who represented a forerunner of the British and Irish Lions, known as the Anglo-Welsh on their tour of Australasia in 1904.

Early life
David Trail was born on 17 October 1875 in Munrorie. He attended Dulwich College. He went on to study medicine and became a doctor practising at Guy's Hospital.

Rugby union career

Trail learnt his rugby at Dulwich College, a school that had already produced a number of international players. He went on to play for the powerful Guy's Hospital Football Club. He made his international debut on 2 July 1904 at Sydney in the Australia vs Anglo-Welsh match.
Of the 4 matches he played he was on the winning side on 3 occasions.
He played his final match for Anglo-Welsh on 13 August 1904 at Wellington in the New Zealand vs Anglo-Welsh match.

References

1875 births
1935 deaths
British & Irish Lions rugby union players from England
English rugby union players
People educated at Dulwich College
Rugby union forwards